Nighthawks is a 2019 American thriller film written, directed, and produced by Grant S. Johnson, which had its premiere in May 2019. The film stars Chace Crawford, Kevin Zegers and Janet Montgomery.

Synopsis
Wide-eyed Midwest transplant Stan (Chace Crawford) agrees to play wingman to his calculating and privileged roommate Chad (Kevin Zegers) as they embark upon an exploration of glittering New York nightlife, whose darkest secrets are held captive by an elite band of millennials known as Nighthawks.

Cast
 Chace Crawford as Stan
 Kevin Zegers as Chad
 Janet Montgomery as Marguerite
 Blue Kimble as Kentavious
 Lola Bessis as Maxime
 Michele Weaver as Alison
 Juliette Labelle as Caroline
 Tyler Weaks as Oliver
 Ping Hue as Soo
 Craig Castaldo though he also goes by Craig Schwartz and by Radioman as homeless man

Release
The film premiered in a private screening on May 4, 2019, in New York. The film also played at the Montana International Film Festival.

The film was released through online platforms on October 3, 2019.

References

2019 films
2019 thriller films
American thriller films
2010s English-language films
2010s American films